The 2021–22 Stony Brook Seawolves men's basketball team represented Stony Brook University in the 2021–22 NCAA Division I men's basketball season. They played their home games at the Island Federal Credit Union Arena in Stony Brook, New York and were led by third-year head coach Geno Ford. They competed as members of the America East Conference.

The 2021–22 season was the program's last season as an America East member. Stony Brook will join the Colonial Athletic Association on July 1, 2022. However they announced Stony Brook was not eligible for the America East conference tournament that season.

Previous season
In a season limited due to the ongoing COVID-19 pandemic, the Seawolves finished the 2020–21 season 9–14, 7–9 in America East play to finish in seventh place. They lost in the opening round of the America East tournament to UMass Lowell. Mouhamadou Gueye won the America East Defensive Player of the Year award.

Offseason

Departures

Incoming transfers

2021 recruiting class

Roster

Schedule and results

|-
!colspan=12 style=| Non-conference regular season

|-
!colspan=12 style=| America East regular season

Source

See also 

 2021–22 Stony Brook Seawolves women's basketball team

References 

Stony Brook Seawolves men's basketball seasons
Stony Brook Seawolves
Stony Brook Seawolves men's basketball
Stony Brook Seawolves men's basketball